KlezKanada is a Canadian organization for the promotion of klezmer music and Yiddish culture. Its principal program is a week-long Jewish music festival founded in 1996 that takes place annually in August at Camp B'nai B'rith in Lantier, Quebec (north of Montreal). The organization also hosts workshops, concerts, and other educational programs in Montreal throughout the year.

History 
KlezKanada was founded by a group of local cultural activists led by Hy and Sandy Goldman in 1996. In its first year its festival had roughly 300 participants. It was inspired by KlezKamp, a similar festival in New York State which had been founded a few years earlier. By the late 1990s KlezKanada had grown in size and began attracting many of the top musicians in the field, as well as offering a scholarship program for young musicians.

In an article on klezmer, Mike Anklewicz noted the development of the festival: 

The camp is based around courses and lectures during the day (relating to klezmer music, Yiddish, and other topics) and concerts at night.

In 2001, "of the [festival's] 37 teaching and performance staff, 22 were New York-based." Since then, the festival faculty has become more diverse: in 2018, fewer than half of the teaching faculty were American, while over a third came from Canada, and the rest from other countries, including Germany, Poland, and Russia.

Past participants 

 Adeena Karasick
 Adrienne Cooper
 Alan Bern
 Alicia Svigals
 Anthony Coleman
 Anthony Russell
 Beyond the Pale
 Brave Old World
 César Lerner
 Daniel Kahn & the Painted Bird
 Elaine Hoffman Watts
 Flory Jagoda
 Frank London
 Geoff Berner
 German Goldenshteyn
 Hankus Netsky
 Henry Sapoznik
 The Klezmatics
 Klezmer Conservatory Band
 Lisa Gutkin
 Margot Leverett
 Mark Slobin
 Michael Alpert
 Michael Steinlauf
 Michael Wex
 Nahma Sandrow
 Pete Rushefsky
 Socalled
 Stuart Brotman
 Tamara Brooks
 Theodore Bikel
 Veretski Pass
 Yaëla Hertz

References

External links 
 Official website

1996 establishments in Quebec
Ashkenazi Jewish culture in Quebec
Jewish music festivals
Jewish organizations established in 1996
Klezmer
Music festivals in Quebec
Music festivals established in 1996
Summer festivals
Yiddish culture in Canada